Bálint Vogyicska (born 27 February 1998) is a Hungarian football player who plays for Ajka.

Club career
On 16 February 2022, Bogyicska joined Ajka.

Club statistics

Updated to games played as of 15 May 2022.

References

External links
MLSZ 
HLSZ 

1998 births
Living people
People from Mohács
Hungarian footballers
Hungary youth international footballers
Association football defenders
MTK Budapest FC players
Vasas SC players
Nemzeti Bajnokság I players
Gyirmót FC Győr players
FC Ajka players
Nemzeti Bajnokság II players
Sportspeople from Baranya County